Hands-on management is a particular style of management where the manager or person in charge is particularly active in day-to-day business and leadership. It is not to be confused with micromanagement and is seen as the opposite of Laissez-faire management style.

Purpose
Hands-on includes traits and actions such as:

 Understanding of the business and shows interest
 Informed but passive with ideas
 Follows up on agreed decisions

The opposite to hands-on is a hands-off manager or management style.

References

External links
How To Implement New Processes At Work

Business terms
Human resource management
Management
Management by type
Quality management
Workplace